Sir Archibald Macdonald, 1st Baronet (13 July 1747 – 18 May 1826) was a Scottish lawyer, judge and politician.

Early life
He was the posthumous son of Sir Alexander Macdonald, 7th Baronet, and younger brother of the 8th baronet (see Baron Macdonald), born at Armadale Castle on Skye. He was brought to England, away from Jacobite influence and entered Westminster School in 1760. He went on to Christ Church, Oxford in 1764, graduating B.A. in 1768 and M.A. in 1772. He was called to the bar at Lincoln's Inn in 1770.

In politics
Macdonald was Member of Parliament for Hindon in Wiltshire (1777–1780) and then for Newcastle-under-Lyme (1780–1792), a seat where his father-in-law had a strong influence.

In politics, Macdonald followed the Whig lead of his father-in-law. He became solicitor-general in 1784 and attorney-general, and was knighted, in 1788. He served as the prosecutor in Thomas Paine's criminal libel trial over the publication of Rights of Man in 1792.

The 1792 Slave Trade Bill passed the House of Commons mangled and mutilated by the modifications and amendments of Pitt, Earl of Mornington, Edward James Eliot and MacDonald, it lay for years, in the House of Lords.

Judge
Macdonald was appointed as second judge of the Carmarthen circuit in Wales in 1780. He was promoted as Lord Chief Baron of the Exchequer in 1793, and served in this post until he retired in 1813, with failing eyesight. On his retirement from the court, Macdonald was created a baronet, on 27 November 1813.

Family

In 1777, Macdonald married Lady Louisa Leveson-Gower, daughter of Granville Leveson-Gower, 1st Marquess of Stafford (at the time called by the courtesy title Earl Gower), then Lord President of the Council. They had two sons and five daughters.

Three children of the marriage survived Macdonald, including Sir James Macdonald, 2nd Baronet (1784–1832). Susan (1780–1803) was the illustrator of "The Sports of the Genii" (1804) by Anne Hunter. Caroline Diana (1790–1867) married the cleric Thomas Randolph, son of John Randolph, and was mother of the naval officer George Granville Randolph.

References

Notes

1747 births
1826 deaths
Baronets in the Baronetage of the United Kingdom
People educated at Westminster School, London
Alumni of Christ Church, Oxford
Members of Lincoln's Inn
Members of the Parliament of Great Britain for Newcastle-under-Lyme
Chief Barons of the Exchequer
Younger sons of baronets
British MPs 1774–1780
British MPs 1780–1784
British MPs 1784–1790
British MPs 1790–1796